The Corley Conspiracy is an opera by Tim Benjamin to a libretto by Sean Starke, who also directed. The work premiered on 19 September 2007 in the Purcell Room at the Southbank Centre in London; the orchestral parts were played by the ensemble Radius. The opera was commissioned by the London Design Festival 2007.

Roles

The performance of the work lasts for about 75 minutes.

Structure

Unusually for an opera, all the vocal parts are spoken, but unlike a play, the music is continuous and relates strongly to the text.

Background

The text of the work is based on Mike Corley's experiences and theories, as shown in his Usenet posts and on his website.

Mike Corley is an information technology specialist residing in the United Kingdom. He has a long history of posting Usenet messages detailing how MI5 has allegedly bugged his home, watched him via his television and is sending people to follow him around and harass him. These messages are often crossposted to many different newsgroups. His claims of being persecuted by MI5 (the Subject: line of his posts) have led to claims that he is suffering from paranoid schizophrenia. He has claimed in his posts that television personalities are often talking about him in code and are part of the MI5 conspiracy. He has been banned from posting through Google for his abuse of Usenet and has been similarly barred from most Internet service providers in England, an assertion which Corley contested in August 2012.

See also
Usenet celebrity

References

External links
 Official website
 Review of the work

Operas
English-language operas
2007 operas
Usenet people
Works about conspiracy theories